Dream Boys is a Rwandan R&B duo composed of Nemeye Platini (known as Platini) and Claude Mujyanama (called T.M.C.). The group was formed in 2009 and has toured throughout Rwanda as well as regionally to member countries of the East African Community, including Uganda.

History
Platini and Mujyanama are friends since childhood and are both university graduates. The duo compose their own songs, which are produced by studio professionals in Uganda and Rwanda. They are managed under the label Kina Music.

Their first album, Sinzika, was released in 2009 to strong success in Rwanda. The first single off the album, Magorwa, achieved widespread popularity across the country. Their second release,  Isaano, was well received but garnered less popular attention than their debut. A third album, Uzambariza Mama, was released in 2012. The duo has also collaborated with other local and regional artists on numerous singles, including No one like me with Ugandan Eddy Kenzo, Nzagaruka with Burundian T-Max, and Rwanda uri Nziza with Rwandans Kitoko, Urban Boyz, Riderman and Uganda's Radio and Weasel. The band has named Rwandan artists Miss Jojo and Tom Close as inspirations, as well as Tanzanian Ali Kiba.

Themes
The music of Dream Boys addresses themes relating to the challenges of their daily lives in Rwanda. The band has publicly advocated for social causes, including a male circumcision campaign in Ruhango District to reduce prevalence of HIV infection.

Awards
Dream Boys took fourth place in the annual Primus Guma Guma Super Star talent competition, held at Amahoro Stadium in August 2013. The duo has won numerous other awards, including a Pearl of Africa music award.

References

Rwandan musical groups
Musical duos
Contemporary R&B duos